Jiménez is a town and seat of the municipality of Jiménez in the Mexican state of Coahuila, at an altitude of 250 meters above sea level. It is located on the confluence of the Río San Diego and the Rio Grande (locally known as the Río Bravo) bordering with the U.S. state of Texas. It had a population of 1,160 inhabitants in the 2010 census, and is, unusually for a Mexican municipal seat, the second-largest locality in the municipality, after the town of San Carlos (which had a population of 3,126).

The town was founded in 1859. under the name of "Resurrección" by captain Manuel Leal, and tejano expatriate families from San Antonio, Texas.

History
In June 1675 the area was first visited by  Lt. Fernando del Bosque, on a reconnaissance expedition up the Rio Grande from the city of Nuestra Sra. de Guadalupe (Monclova). He was accompanied by the Franciscan Friars Juan Larios and Dionisio de San Buenaventura. The troop camped on the edge of the San Diego river, which the Indians called the "Nueces", very near the site of the actual town of Jiménez today. They met with two local Indian chiefs, Bacora and Pinanaca whose tribe, numbering 150 people, were on a buffalo hunting expedition. Del Bosque named the camp "Santa Clara de las Nueces".

The area was again visited in 1729 by captain, José de Barroterán, who suggested a site on the San Diego river for a possible Presidio, but no attempt was made at foundation.

In December 1735, Governor Blas de la Garza Falcón and Joseph de Eca y Múzquiz selected an area on the banks of the San Diego river for a fort, and actually began cutting logs for its construction, but had to stop operations when they were ordered back to San Juan Bautista. In 1737, permission was given to captain Miguel de la Garza Falcón, son of the governor who had died the previous year, to begin the construction of the presidio on the San Diego, arriving in October of that year with 50 soldiers and officers as well as 16 families for the new presidio which was named "Sacramento".
The place turned out to be a poor choice as the land was difficult to irrigate, and after a brief two years it was moved to Santa Rosa, now Melchor Muzquiz, Coahuila.

In 1773, a second attempt at another location on the San Diego river was attempted, this time the location was  a small spring, tributary to the San Diego named "Aguaverde". The Presidio was completed and occupied by troops by late April 1773. This presidio and garrison lasted at this site for eight years, during which time it saw plenty of action against Indian attacks. In 1781 the garrison was relocated to San Fernando de Austria (now Zaragoza, Coah.), where the company still kept the name of Aguaverde, but the presidio was abandoned. It was not occupied again until the late 1840s and early 1850s, where the garrison of San Vicente was transplanted into the old Presidio.

In December 1859, a group headed by captain Manuel Leal founded villa La Resurreccion, with families from the surrounding towns of Piedras Negras, Guerrero, Nava, Gigedo, as well as a group of families from San Antonio, Texas. The town was founded on lands previously occupied by the Colonia de Agua Verde.

In February 1861 the village was attacked by a large force of Lipan Apache people. Some casualties were reported, among them was an old veteran of the  Texas Independence and Texas Ranger, Damacio Galván. The Lipans carried off some 500 head of cattle, as well as some children from the town.
This fierce attack discouraged many of the settlers and the town's population diminished drastically, many of the families from San Antonio returned to Texas.

During the mid to late 1860s, more settlers arrived from neighboring towns, and the town prospered. In 1875, the villa was renamed "Jiménez" in honor of  Mariano Jiménez, a leader during Mexico's Independence movement.

On September 26, 1906 the first armed rebellion against the dictatorship of Porfirio Díaz, precursor to the Mexican Revolution began in Jiménez, it was led by Juan José Arredondo and Calixto Guerra, members of the Partido Liberal Mexicano of Ricardo Flores Magon.  The movement was short lived as Federal troop reinforcements from Piedras Negras, surprised and dispersed the revolutionaries the next day at Hacienda Victoria.

On June 24, 1908 another rebellion was attempted this time at Las Vacas (Cd. Acuña), by Benjamín Canales and Calixto Guerra. After a day-long battle and heavy losses on both sides, the federal garrison prevailed and the revolutionaries were forced to retreat across the border into Texas.

Geography

Demography
In the 2010 census the municipality had a population of 9,935 inhabitants.

Climate
The region of Jiménez has a hot, semi-arid climate. During the summer, the temperature averages (mean) between 79°F (26°C) and 88°F (31°C).

The highest precipitation is typically recorded in May, June, September, and October, with an average monthly downfall in the range of 300 to 400 mm.

Natural resources
The region's  main resources are agriculture and livestock.

Education
The municipality of Jiménez has a total of 33 primary schools, and 5 secondary schools.

Tourism
The Plaza Francisco I. Madero
Monument to Ricardo Flores Magón and the Revolutionaries of Sept. 26, 1906
The Old Cemetery
The San Diego River
Hacienda Victoria

List of Presidentes Municipales

Regino R. Garza	(1912)
Félix Arreola   	(1913)(1914–1917)
Ursulo Villarreal	(1918)
Félix Arreola Martínez	(1919–1920)	
Ramón Faz de Hoyos	(1921–1922)	
Encarnación Domínguez	(1923–1924)	
Pedro Villarreal Guerra	(1925–1926)	
Herculano Villarreal	(1927–1928)	
José Moreno Rivas	(1929–1930)	
Rutilo Guerra	        (1931–1932)	
José Moreno Rivas	(1933–1934)	
Jesús E. Sánchez	(1935–1936)	
Silverio Campos	(1937–1938)	PNR
Epifanio Martínez	(1939–1940)	PRM
Alejandro Siller	(1941–1942)	PRM
Dionisio Pérez Faz	(1943–1945)	PRM
Pedro Bravo Zertuche	(1946–1948)	PRI
José V. Sánchez	(1949–1951)	PRI
Cruz Olivo Rico	(1952–1954)	PRI
Justo Guerra Arreola	(1955–1957)	PRI
José Sánchez Arreola	(1958–1960)	PRI
Anselmo Balderas Abundis	(1961–1963)	PRI
Emilio Ramírez Escobedo	(1964–1966)	PRI
Ignacio Rivero Ríos	(1967–1969)	PRI
J. Cruz Olivo Rico	(1970–1972)	PRI
Apolonio Martínez Rodríguez	(1973–1975)	PRI
Ma. del Consuelo Villarreal Pérez de G.	(1976–1978)	PRI
Miguel Lozano Arizpe	 (1979–1981)	PRI
Adolfo Narváez Faz	(1982–1984)	PRI
Ludivina Hernández de Treviño	(1985–1987)	PRI
Evelio Celedón Banda	(1988–1990)	PRI
Pedro Bravo Berlanga	(1991–1993)	PRI
Faustino Infante Regalado	(1994–1996)	PRI
Juan Antonio Balderas Balboa	(1997–1999)	PRI
Federico Ordoñez Coronado	(2000–2002)  PRI
Agapito Balderas Elizondo	 (2003–2005)  PRI
Francisco Trujillo Reyes	(2006–2008)  COAL.
Mario Robles Molina	(2008–2009)  COAL.
Juan Antonio Balderas Balboa	(2010–2013)	PRI
Salvador Ricardo Lozano Arizpe (2014-2017) COAL.

Notable people from Jiménez 
 Calixto Guerra - Jiménez Revolutionary of 1906 and Las Vacas in 1908
 Vicente Arreola Herrera (1875–1935) - Mining Engineer, industrialist

Jiménez in popular culture 
 In the opening jail scene in the 1992 film El Mariachi by writer/director Robert Rodriguez.
 The 2005 film The Three Burials of Melquiades Estrada directed by Tommy Lee Jones, the town that Jones' character is trying to return the body of Melquiades Estrada for burial.

References 

American diaspora in Mexico
Populated places in Coahuila
Populated places established in 1859
1859 establishments in Mexico
Coahuila populated places on the Rio Grande
Tejano culture